Westmoreland is a town in Cheshire County, New Hampshire, United States. The population was 1,706 at the 2020 census, down from 1,874 at the 2010 census. Westmoreland is historically an agricultural town, with much arable farmland.

History

Indigenous peoples 
Prior to European colonization, present-day Westmoreland was inhabited by numerous indigenous tribes. The upper Connecticut River valley was a popular region for short-term Indigenous villages mostly used for hunting and fishing. Tribes such as the Pennacook  Confederation and the Abenaki were frequent visitors to the area. In the 1670s, King Philip's War led to the migration of most indigenous tribes to Canada. Indigenous peoples did not understand the concept of individual land ownership, which resulted in numerous misunderstandings and conflict between them and English settlers. The English settlers purchase of land and construction of permanent settlements disrupted the hunting and fishing traditions of the indigenous tribes. 

While Indigenous activity was common in Westmoreland, not many aboriginal sites have been found. A "Pow-wow Rock" can be located off Poocham Road in Westmoreland across from the Thompson place (1970). The name Poocham is an Abenaki word for "gathering place". At this location, records describe the hosting of Indigenous pow-wows and the exchanging of prisoners.

Colonial 
Once known as "Great Meadow", the town was first granted in 1735 by Governor Jonathan Belcher of Massachusetts as "Number 2", second in a line of Connecticut River fort towns designed to protect the colonies from Indian attack. This part of the river was a favorite Indian campsite, and the settlers who came beginning in 1741 were several times victims of attack. When the border between Massachusetts and the Province of New Hampshire was fixed (with Number 2 on the New Hampshire side), the town was regranted in 1752 by Governor Benning Wentworth as Westmoreland, named for John Fane, 7th Earl of Westmorland.

The Park Hill Meetinghouse, built in 1762, has a Paul Revere bell. Considered one of the most beautiful churches in New England, it was moved to its present site by oxen in 1779 and renovated in 1826.

Geography
Westmoreland is bounded on the west by the Connecticut River, which is the state border with Vermont. Hyland Hill, elevation  and the highest point in town, is on the eastern border and although it is now private land, it is a local hiking and hunting destination.

Westmoreland is served by state routes 12 and 63.

Adjacent municipalities
 Walpole (north)
 Surry (northeast)
 Keene (east)
 Chesterfield (south)
 Dummerston, Vermont (southwest)
 Putney, Vermont (west)

Demographics

At the 2000 census there were 1,747 people, 576 households, and 445 families living in the town.  The population density was 48.7 people per square mile (18.8/km).  There were 618 housing units at an average density of 17.2 per square mile (6.7/km).  The racial makeup of the town was 97.82% White, 0.34% African American, 0.29% Native American, 0.80% Asian, 0.34% from other races, and 0.40% from two or more races. Hispanic or Latino of any race were 0.92%.

Of the 576 households 31.6% had children under the age of 18 living with them, 69.6% were married couples living together, 3.8% had a female householder with no husband present, and 22.7% were non-families. 17.4% of households were one person and 7.8% were one person aged 65 or older.  The average household size was 2.57 and the average family size was 2.92.

The age distribution was 19.9% under the age of 18, 6.6% from 18 to 24, 26.8% from 25 to 44, 27.4% from 45 to 64, and 19.3% 65 or older.  The median age was 43 years. For every 100 females, there were 97.6 males.  For every 100 females age 18 and over, there were 99.6 males.

The median household income was $55,875 and the median family income was $62,857. Males had a median income of $40,515 versus $28,456 for females. The per capita income for the town was $24,488.  About 0.4% of families and 2.5% of the population were below the poverty line, including none of those under age 18 and 5.4% of those age 65 or over.

Notable people 

 Clinton Babbitt (1831–1907), US congressman
 Goldsmith Bailey (1823–1862), US congressman
 Nathaniel S. Benton (1792–1869), Secretary of State, state senator from New York
 Joseph Buffum, Jr. (1784–1874), US congressman, judge
 Martin Butterfield (1790–1866), US congressman
 Levi K. Fuller (1841–1896), 44th governor of Vermont
 John M. Goodenow (1782–1838), US congressman
 Ernest Hebert (born 1941), author
 Thomas B. Marsh (1800–1866), religious leader
 Robert Olmstead (born 1954), author
 Everett Warner (1877–1963), artist, print-maker

References

External links

 
 Westmoreland Public Library
 Westmoreland Park Hill Meeting House & Historical Society
 New Hampshire Economic and Labor Market Information Bureau Profile

 
Towns in Cheshire County, New Hampshire
New Hampshire populated places on the Connecticut River
Towns in New Hampshire